Abacetus antoinei is a species of ground beetle in the subfamily Pterostichinae. It was described by Straneo in 1951 and is an endemic species found in Morocco.

References

antoinei
Beetles described in 1951
Insects of North Africa